The 2018–19 1. FC Magdeburg season is the 53rd season in the football club's history. The season covers a period from 1 July 2018 to 30 June 2019. It is the first season the club plays in 2. Bundesliga, and the second season in a second-tier league after they had competed in the DDR-Liga in the 1966–67 season.

Players

Squad information

Friendly matches

Competitions

2. Bundesliga

League table

Results summary

Results by round

Matches

DFB-Pokal

References 

1. FC Magdeburg seasons
Magdeburg